IMR Legendary Powders is a line of smokeless powders which are popularly used in sporting and military/police firearm cartridges. The initials 'IMR' stand for Improved Military Rifle powder.  IMR powders makes a line of various types of smokeless powder suitable for loading many cartridges for rifles, handguns, and shotguns.

History

First powder plant
The French revolution caused E.I. DuPont de Nemours and Company to migrate to the United States in 1802.  He built a factory to produce gunpowder near the site of Eleutherian Mills in Newark, Delaware. Today that site has been repurposed as the Hagley Museum and Library.  DuPont's first product at the site was blackpowder. DuPont powders were instrumental in helping to build the infrastructure of nations worldwide. They were vital to the mining and construction industries until replaced by more modern explosives. DuPont became a major producer of Dynamite and eventually developed many other products lines.

The line of improved military rifle powder came into existence in the 1920s.  It consisted of nitrocellulose, dinitrotoluene (DNT), graphite, and a small amount (0.6%) of diphenylamine (stabilizer). Potassium sulfate is added to decrease the amount of muzzle flash. Cartridges loaded with this powder include .30-06 Springfield and 7.92×57mm Mauser.

Plant expansion 
DuPont began production of the IMR line of smokeless powders across the river from the Wilmington Plant at Carney's Point, New Jersey in 1892.  The first powders were called "MR" for Military Rifle powder.  In the 1920s these powders were improved and the name was changed to IMR.  Various different powder are produced and are given numbers to distinguish them.  The different types of powder typically have different burning rates.  Due to the construction of metallic cartridges, different amounts of powder of different burning speeds are used to obtain optimum performance and accuracy.

Due to the increased demand for these powders which resulted from World War I an additional plant was constructed in Valleyfield, Canada which remains the primary source of IMR powders today. During World War II up to 1,000,000 pounds of powder was being shipped per day.

Product detail 

DuPont released their first handloading guide in the 1950s which was aimed at reloading of shot shell.  IMR Legendary Powders includes powder lines for rifle, handgun, and shotgun reloading.

IMR Legendary Powders 

 Rifle powders
 3031
 4007 SSC
 4064
 4166
 4198
 4227
 4320
 4350
 4831
 4895
 7828
 8208 XBR

 Handgun powders
 PB
 SR-7625
 SR-4756
 SR-4759
 Trail Boss

 Shotgun powders
 700-X
 800-X
 Blue
 Green
 Red
 Target
 Unequal

Current ownership 
In 2003 the Hodgdon Powder Company purchased IMR powders.

References

External links 
 Granger,  Drawing of the DuPont Blackpowder Plant
 Early DuPont Pistol Powder No. 5
 IMR Handloading Guide

Firearm propellants